Radio Universidad may refer to:

Radio Universidad (Chihuahua), with frequencies XHRU-FM 105.3 FM and XHERU-FM 106.9 FM
Radio Universidad (Yucatán), with frequencies XERUY-AM 1120 and XHRUY-FM 103.9 in Mérida, and XHMIN-FM 94.5 in Tizimín

See also
Radio Universidad Autónoma de Guerrero
Radio Universidade de Coimbra